The Deutsche Rallye Meisterschaft (occasionally German Rally Championship) is Germany's and was West Germany's leading domestic motor rally competition. While having a background in dirt-surface off-road events the modern DRM is a tarmac rally competition, a condition it shares with Germany's World Rally Championship event Rallye Deutschland.

History 
The history of the Deutsche Rallye Meisterschaft dates back to the 1950s, when the rallies were run differently than they are today. At that time, these rallies were more reliability and orientation drives. The Hessian Rally and the Olympic Rally in 1972 are considered the first rallies of the type that were later typical of the process and are for the Deutsche Rallye Meisterschaft. After the Deutsche Rallye Meisterschaft was suspended in 2006, it has been held again since 2007.

Champions
Sourced from:

References

External links
 Series Official Web Site

Rally racing series
Auto racing series in Germany
Motorsport competitions in West Germany